
Nick or Nicholas Walsh may refer to:

Nick Welch (basketball) (born 1983), American basketball player
Nick Welch (British Army officer) (born  1964)
Nick Welch (cricketer) (born 1998), Zimbabwean cricketer